Joachim Holst-Jensen (16 June 1880 – 7 March 1963) was a Norwegian stage and film actor. He appeared in more than 40 films between 1927 and 1960.

Partial filmography

 Den glade enke i Trangvik (1927) - Berg, telegrafist
 Madame besøker Oslo (1927) - Baron Felix de Video
 Vi som går kjøkkenveien (1933) - Journalist
 Jeppe på bjerget (1933) - Venn av baronen
 To levende og en død (1937) - Engelhardt
 Fant (1937) - Søren, Fændriks onkel
 Ungen (1938) - a waiter
 Bør Børson Jr. (1938) - Ole Elveplassen
 Familien på Borgan (1939) - Cohn, advokat
 De vergeløse (1939) - Wollert, professor
 Her Little Majesty (1939) - Generalkonsul Hauge
 Gjest Baardsen (1939) - Mons Peder Michelsen, arrestforvarer
 Gryr i Norden (1939) - Christian H.
 Bastard (1940) - En fangevokter
 Tante Pose (1940) - Plum, sakfører
 Tørres Snørtevold (1940) - En gjest
 Nygifta (1941) - Mr. Gundersen
 The Sausage-Maker Who Disappeared (1941) - pølsemaker H. Brand
 Gullfjellet (1941) - Tater-Mekkel
 Trysil-Knut (1942) - Anneus Phil, intendant
 Jeg drepte! (1942) - Fredriksen
 En herre med bart (1942) - Nils, mannen til Miriam
 Den farlige leken (1942)
 Hansen og Hansen (1943) - Tallaksen, vassdragsingeniør
 Sangen til livet (1943) - Graali, redaktør
 Vigdis (1943) - P.P. Jeremiassen, skomaker
 Villmarkens lov (1944) - Direktøren
 Et spøkelse forelsker seg (1946) - Et spøkelse
 Trollfossen (1946) - Vang, Sylvias far
 Den hemmelighetsfulle leiligheten (1946) - Doktoren
 To mistenkelige personer (1950)
 Storfolk og småfolk (1951) - En omstreifer
 Ukjent mann (1951) - Jansen
 Emergency Landing (1952) - Willie, presten
 Skøytekongen (1953)
 Selkvinnen (1953) - Rantzau, dommer
 Circus Fandango (1954) - Papa, clown
 Troll i ord (1954) - Joachim Tønnesen
 På solsiden (1956)
 Nine Lives (1957) - Bestefar
 Hjemme hos oss. Husmorfilmen 1957. (1957)
 I slik en natt (1958) - Goggen
 Hete septemberdager (1959) - Hennes mann 'malersvennen'
 5 loddrett (1959) - Mr. Backer, Managing Director at A / S Grammofon
 Millionær for en aften (1960)

References

External links

1880 births
1963 deaths
Norwegian male stage actors
Norwegian male film actors
Norwegian male silent film actors
20th-century Norwegian male actors